L.A. Confidential (1990) is a neo-noir novel by James Ellroy and the third of his L.A. Quartet series. It is dedicated to Mary Doherty Ellroy. The epigraph is "A glory that costs everything and means nothing"—Steve Erickson.

Plot
The story follows several Los Angeles Police Department officers in the early 1950s who become embroiled in a mix of sex, corruption, and murder following a massacre at the Nite Owl coffee shop. The story eventually encompasses organized crime, political corruption, heroin trafficking, pornography, prostitution, and Hollywood. The title refers to the scandal magazine Confidential, which is fictionalized as Hush-Hush. It also deals with the real "Bloody Christmas" scandal.

The three protagonists are LAPD officers. Edmund Exley, the son of prestigious detective Preston Exley, is a "straight arrow" who informs on other officers in a police brutality scandal. He is first and foremost a politician and a ladder climber. This earns the enmity of Wendell "Bud" White, an intimidating enforcer with a  fixation on men who abuse women. Between the two of them is Jack Vincennes, who acts as more of a celebrity than a cop, who is a technical advisor on a police television show called Badge of Honor (similar to the real-life show Dragnet) and provides tips to a scandal magazine. The three of them must set their differences aside to unravel the conspiracy linking the novel's events.

Reception
The Chicago Tribune said, "Ellroy is a master at juggling plot lines, using a stripped, spare noir style that hits like a cleaver but is honed like a scalpel".

The Los Angeles Times gave a critical review, calling the novel "incontinent mayhem" with a plot "faster than a stray bullet and equally random."

Kirkus Reviews described LA Confidential as "energetic, sprawling, and often stylistically irritating."

The New York Times wrote that "the plotting becomes so tortuous and the narrative style so burdened by repetitive scenes of atrocious violence that the author compromises the truthfulness of his own vision."

Adaptations

Film
The book was adapted for a 1997 film of the same name, directed and co-written by Curtis Hanson and starring Kevin Spacey, Russell Crowe, Guy Pearce, James Cromwell, Kim Basinger, David Strathairn and Danny DeVito. The film was universally acclaimed. It was nominated for nine Academy Awards; Kim Basinger won both a Golden Globe and an Academy Award for Best Supporting Actress for her performance in the film, while Curtis Hanson and Brian Helgeland won the Oscar for Best Adapted Screenplay.

Television
In 2003, a television pilot of L.A. Confidential was aired. However, the pilot was not picked up as a running series. The show's main actors would have been Kiefer Sutherland, Josh Hopkins, David Conrad, Pruitt Taylor Vince, Melissa George, Tom Nowicki, and Eric Roberts. The pilot is a special feature on the two-disc DVD and the Blu-ray releases of the film.

In 2018, CBS ordered a new pilot based on the novel. The pilot  would star Walton Goggins as Vincennes, Mark Webber as White, Brian J. Smith as Exley, Sarah Jones as Lynn, Alana Arenas as June, and Shea Whigham as Dick Stensland. In May 2018, it was announced that the pilot would not be moving forward.

See also

References

External links
 
 

Fiction set in the 1950s
1990 American novels
American novels adapted into films
Fictional portrayals of the Los Angeles Police Department
Novels by James Ellroy
Novels set in Los Angeles
Hollywood novels
Novels set in the 1950s
Neo-noir novels
Police misconduct in fiction